The National Gallery of Victoria, popularly known as the NGV, is an art museum in Melbourne, Victoria, Australia. Founded in 1861, it is Australia's oldest and most visited art museum.

The NGV houses an encyclopedic art collection across two sites: NGV International, located on St Kilda Road in the Melbourne Arts Precinct of Southbank, and the Ian Potter Centre: NGV Australia, located nearby at Federation Square. The NGV International building, designed by Sir Roy Grounds, opened in 1968, and was redeveloped by Mario Bellini before reopening in 2003. It houses the gallery's international art collection and is on the Victorian Heritage Register. 

The Ian Potter Centre: NGV Australia, designed by Lab Architecture Studio, opened in 2002 and houses the gallery's Australian art collection.

A third site, The Fox: NGV Contemporary, is planned to open in 2028, and will be Australia's largest contemporary gallery.

History

19th century

In 1850, the Port Phillip District of New South Wales was granted separation, officially becoming the colony of Victoria on 1 July 1851. In the wake of a gold rush the following month, Victoria emerged as Australia's richest colony, and Melbourne, its capital, Australia's largest and wealthiest city. With Melbourne's rapid growth came calls for the establishment of a public art gallery, and in 1859, the Government of Victoria pledged £2000 for the acquisition of plaster casts of sculpture. These works were displayed in the Museum of Art, opened by Governor Sir Henry Barkly in May 1861 on the lower floor of the south wing of the public Library (now the State Library of Victoria) on Swanston Street. Further money was set aside in the early 1860s for the purchase of original paintings by British and Victorian artists. These works were first displayed in December 1864 in the newly opened Picture Gallery, which remained under the curatorial administration of the Public Library until 1882. Grand designs for a building fronting Lonsdale and Swanston streets were drawn by Nicholas Chevalier in 1860 and Frederick Grosse in 1865, featuring an enormous and elaborate library and gallery, but these visions were never realised.

On 24 May 1874, the first purpose built gallery, known as the McArthur Gallery, opened in the McArthur room of the State Library, and the following year, the Museum of Art was renamed the National Gallery of Victoria. The McArthur Gallery was only ever intended as a temporary home until the much grander vision was to be realised. However such an edifice did not eventuate and the complex was instead developed incrementally over several decades.

The National Gallery of Victoria Art School, associated with the gallery, was founded in 1867 and remained the leading centre for academic art training in Australia until about 1910. The School's graduates went on to become some of Australia's most significant artists. This later became the VCA (Victorian College of the Arts), which was bought by The University of Melbourne in 2007 after it went bankrupt.

In 1887, the Buvelot Gallery (later Swinburne Hall) was opened, along with the Painting School studios. In 1892, two more galleries were added: Stawell (now Cowen) and La Trobe.

In 1888, the gallery purchased Lawrence Alma-Tadema's 1871 painting The Vintage Festival for £4000, its most expensive acquisition of the 19th century.

20th century

The gallery's collection was built from both gifts of works of art and monetary donations. The most significant, the Felton Bequest, was established by the will of Alfred Felton and from 1904, has been used to purchase over 15,000 works of art.

Since the Felton Bequest, the gallery had long held plans to build a permanent facility, however it was not until 1943 that the State Government chose a site, Wirth's Park, just south of the Yarra River. £3 million was put forward in February 1960 and Roy Grounds was announced as the architect.

In 1959, the commission to design a new gallery was awarded to the architectural firm Grounds Romberg Boyd. In 1962, Roy Grounds split from his partners Frederick Romberg and Robin Boyd, retained the commission, and designed the gallery at 180 St Kilda Road (now known as NGV International). The new bluestone clad building was completed in December 1967 and Victorian premier Henry Bolte officially opened it on 20 August 1968. One of the features of the building is the Leonard French stained glass ceiling, one of the world's largest pieces of suspended stained glass, which casts colourful light on the floor below. The water-wall entrance is another well-known feature of the building.

In 1997, redevelopment of the building was proposed, with Mario Bellini chosen as architect and an estimated project cost of $161.9 million. The design was extensive, creating all new galleries leaving only the exterior, the central courtyard and Great Hall intact. The plans included doing away with the water wall, but following public protests organised by the National Trust Victoria, the design was altered to include a new one slightly forward of the original. During the redevelopment, many works were moved to a temporary external annex known as ‘NGV on Russell’, at the State Library with its entrance on Russell Street.

21st century

A major fundraising drive was launched on 10 October 2000 to redevelop the ageing St Kilda Road building and although the state government committed the majority of the funds, private donations were sought in addition to federal funding. The drive achieved its aim and secured $15 million from the Ian Potter Foundation on 11 July 2000, $3 million from Loti Smorgon, $2 million from the Clemenger Foundation, and $1 million each from James Fairfax and the Pratt Foundation.

NGV on Russell closed on 30 June 2002 to make way for the staged opening of the new St Kilda Road gallery. It was officially opened by premier Steve Bracks on 4 December 2003.

The Ian Potter Centre: NGV Australia in Federation Square was designed by Lab Architecture Studio to house the NGV's Australian art collection. It opened in 2002. As such, the NGV's collection is now housed in two separate buildings, with Grounds' building renamed NGV International.

Locations

St Kilda Road: NGV International 
NGV international is located at 180 St Kilda Rd and houses the NGV's European, Asian, Oceanic and American art collections. It houses a number of permanent displays, arranged by region and chronology. It also has a large ground-floor space used for temporary exhibitions, and contemporary art spaces on level 3 are also used for temporary exhibitions. The building is surrounded by a moat and fountains, while the main entrance features a famous water wall, which has been used to display the art of Keith Haring and others. At the rear of NGV International is a sculpture garden, which hosts an annual large-scale installation through the NGV Architecture Commission.

Ian Potter Centre: NGV Australia 
NGV Australia is located in the Ian Potter Centre at Federation Square. The building houses the NGV's Australian collection, with a permanent display presenting a chronological history of Australian art and a selection of the galley's 25,000 Australian works. NGV Australia has a particular focus on Indigenous Australian art, and alongside the permanent displays presents temporary exhibitions relating to Australian art and history.

The Fox: NGV Contemporary 

In 2018, the State Government of Victoria announced a new contemporary art gallery would built behind the Arts Centre and the existing NGV International building. The Government spent $203 million to begin the project, including $150 million to purchase the former Carlton and United Breweries building for the new gallery. The new building is part of a major new $1.7 billion redevelopment of the surrounding Melbourne Arts Precinct which is planned to include 18,000 square metres of new public space, new space for contemporary art and design exhibitions, and a new home for the Australian Performing Arts Gallery. The Ian Potter Foundation pledged $20 million for the new building. The masterplan for the precinct was approved in 2022. The public space is being designed by architecture firms HASSELL and SO-IL with a new elevated garden connecting Hamer Hall and Southbank Boulevard.

The winner of the design competition for the NGV Contemporary was announced in March 2022 as Angelo Candalepas and Associates. In April it was announced that billionaires Paula and Lindsay Fox had donated $100 million to the NGV Contemporary project in the largest ever donation to an Australian art museum, and that the gallery would be named The Fox: NGV Contemporary. Then new gallery will have 13,000 square metres of exhibition space and is planned to open in 2028. It will be Australia's largest contemporary gallery.

Collection

Asian art

The NGV's Asian art collection began in 1862, one year after the gallery's founding, when Frederick Dalgety donated two Chinese plates. The Asian collection has since grown to include significant works from across the continent.

Australian art
The NGV's Australian art collection encompasses Indigenous (Australian Aboriginal) art and artefacts, Australian colonial art, Australian Impressionist art, 20th century, modern and contemporary art. The first curator of Australian Art was Brian Finemore, from 1960 until his death in 1975.

The 1880s saw the birth and development of the Heidelberg School (also known as Australian Impressionism) in the outer suburbs of Melbourne, and the NGV was well-placed to acquire some of the movement's key artworks, including Tom Roberts' Shearing the Rams (1890), Arthur Streeton's ‘The purple noon's transparent might’ (1896), and Frederick McCubbin's The Pioneer (1904).

The Australian collection includes works by Del Kathryn Barton, Charles Blackman, Clarice Beckett, Arthur Boyd, John Brack, Angela Brennan, Rupert Bunny, Louis Buvelot, Ethel Carrick, Nicholas Chevalier, Charles Conder, Olive Cotton, Grace Crowley David Davies, Destiny Deacon, William Dobell, Julie Dowling, Russell Drysdale, E. Phillips Fox, Rosalie Gascoigne, John Glover, Eugene von Guerard, Fiona Hall, Louise Hearman, Joy Hester, Hans Heysen, Emily Kame Kngwarreye, George W. Lambert, Sydney Long, John Longstaff, Frederick McCubbin, Helen Maudsley, Tracey Moffatt, Jan Nelson, Hilda Rix Nicholas, Sidney Nolan, John Perceval, Patricia Piccinini, Margaret Preston, Thea Proctor, Hugh Ramsay, David Rankin, Tom Roberts, John Russell, Grace Cossington Smith, Ethel Spowers, Arthur Streeton, Clara Southern, Jane Sutherland, Violet Teague, Jenny Watson, Fred Williams and others.

A large number of works were donated by Dr. Joseph Brown in 2004 which form the Joseph Brown Collection.

Selected works

International art

The NGV's international art collection encompasses European and international paintings, fashion and textiles, photography, prints and drawings, Asian art, decorative arts, Mesoamerican art, Pacific art, sculpture, antiquities and global contemporary art. It has strong collections in areas as diverse as old masters, Greek vases, Egyptian artefacts and historical European ceramics, and contains the largest and most comprehensive range of artworks in Australia.

The international collection includes works by Arbus, Bernini, Bordone, Canaletto, Cassatt, Cézanne, Constable, Correggio, Dalí, Degas, Delaunay, van Dyck, Emin, Gainsborough, Gentileschi, El Greco, Lange, Manet, Memling, Modigliani, Monet, Picasso, Pissarro, Pittoni, Poussin, Rembrandt, Renoir, Ribera, Riley, Rothko, Rubens, Tiepolo, Tintoretto, Turner, Uccello, Veronese and others.

One of the highlights of the NGV's international collection is Auguste Rodin's first cast of his iconic sculpture The Thinker, executed in 1884. The NGV is also home to the only portrait of Lucrezia Borgia known to have been painted from life, dated to approximately 1515 and attributed to Dosso Dossi. In 2018, the NGV acquired Trilogy of the Desert by Salvador Dalí, after launching a crowd-funding campaign to raise money to fill a gap in its European collection.

Selected works

Photography

In 1967, the NGV established the first curatorial department dedicated to photography in an Australian public gallery, one of the first in the world. It now holds over 15,000 works. In that same year, the Gallery acquired the photography collection's first work, Surrey Hills street 1948 by David Moore and in 1969 the first international work was acquired, Nude 1939 by František Drtikol. The first photographer to exhibit solo at the NGV was Mark Strizic in 1968. Jennie Boddington, a filmmaker, was appointed first full-time curator of photography in 1972, possibly only the third such appointment amongst world public institutions.

Prints and drawings

The NGV's Department of Prints and Drawings is responsible for one third of the gallery's collection. Highlights among the department's holdings include one of the world's largest collections of engravings and woodcuts by Dürer. The NGV is also said to have one of the most impressive collections of works by William Blake, including 36 of the 102 watercolours he worked on up until his death in 1827 to illustrate the Divine Comedy by Dante, the largest number of works from this series held by any gallery in the world. Rembrandt and Goya are also well-represented, and the Australian collection contains a detailed account of the history of graphic arts in Australia.

The NGV no longer dedicates a space to exhibiting works from the Prints and Drawings collection, though some works on paper are rotated within the permanent collection galleries and may appear in exhibitions. Works in the collection may be viewed by appointment in the department's Print Study Room.

Controversies

As a "National Gallery"
When plans for the construction of the National Gallery of Australia in Canberra became firmly established in the 1960s, Australia's state galleries removed the word "national" from their names (for example, the National Gallery of New South Wales in Sydney became the Art Gallery of New South Wales). This naming convention dated back to the 19th century when Australia's colonies were self-governing political entities and had yet to federate. Only the NGV has retained "national" in its name. This has proven to be somewhat contentious, given that the NGV is technically not a national gallery, and occasionally there have been calls for it to follow the example of the other state galleries. According to former Victorian Premier Steve Bracks, "We won't be renaming the National Gallery of Victoria. It has a great tradition. It is the biggest and best gallery in the country and it's one of the biggest and best in the world."

Withdrawal of Chloé 

In May 1883, when the National Gallery of Victoria opened on a Sunday for the first time, a public debate erupted over the propriety of displaying a female nude portrait on the Sabbath. The painting in question, French artist Jules Joseph Lefebvre's Chloé (1875), had been loaned to the gallery that month, and was "cautiously displayed in a dim corner". Nonetheless, Chloé became "Melbourne's femme fatale", and after three weeks of scandal, was withdrawn and hidden from the public. It eventually found a home at Melbourne's Young and Jackson Hotel.

Slaughtered Cow happening 

In 1975, painter and performance artist Ivan Durrant deposited a cow carcass in the NGV forecourt. Durrant later stated that it was part of a performance art piece intended to shock those who might be horrified by the death of the animal while also happy to consume meat. At the time, the NGV denounced the piece as a "sick and disgusting act".

Picasso theft

A famous event in the gallery's history occurred in 1986 with the theft of Pablo Picasso's painting The Weeping Woman (1936). A person or group identifying themselves as the "Australian Cultural Terrorists" claimed responsibility for the theft, stating that the painting was stolen in protest against the perceived poor treatment of the arts by the state government of the time. They sought as a ransom the establishment of an art prize for young artists. The painting was found undamaged in a railway locker two weeks later and returned to the gallery.

Piss Christ

During a retrospective of Andres Serrano's work at the NGV in 1997, the then Catholic Archbishop of Melbourne, George Pell, sought an injunction from the Supreme Court of Victoria to restrain the gallery from publicly displaying Piss Christ, which was not granted. Some days later, one patron attempted to remove the work from the gallery wall, and two teenagers later attacked it with a hammer. Gallery officials reported receiving death threats in response to Piss Christ. NGV Director Timothy Potts cancelled the show, allegedly out of concern for a Rembrandt exhibition that was also on display at the time. Supporters argued that the controversy over Piss Christ is an issue of artistic freedom and freedom of speech.

Special exhibitions
An exhibition known as The Field opened the gallery's new premises on St Kilda Road in 1968. Reflecting the influence of abstract art, particularly New York-inspired Hard Edge and Color Field painting, it featured 74 works by forty (mostly emerging young) Australian painters and sculptors. Described as a radical departure from the gallery's more traditional program, it signified more broadly a growing internationalisation of the Australian art world. The NGV held an exhibition titled "The Field Revisited" in 2018 to mark its 50th anniversary.

Melbourne Winter Masterpieces
The NGV has held several large exhibitions known as Melbourne Winter Masterpieces exhibitions, starting with Impressionists: Masterpieces from the Musee d'Orsay in 2004.

NGV Triennial
In 2013 the NGV launched "Melbourne Now", an exhibition which celebrated the latest art, architecture, design, performance and cultural practice to reflect the complex cultural landscape of creative Melbourne. "Melbourne Now" ran from 22 November 2013 – 23 March 2014 and attracted record attendances of 753,071. Following the success of "Melbourne Now", in 2–14 March the NGV announced a major new initiative, the NGV Triennial. Beginning in the Summer of 2017 and to be held every three years, this ambitious event will be a large-scale celebration of the best of contemporary international art and design. The inaugural Triennial ran from 15 December 2017 to 15 April 2018, and drew almost 1.3 million visitors during its run, making it the most attended exhibition in the gallery's history.

The 2020–21 NGV Triennial opened on 19 December 2020 and closed on 18 April 2021.  The exhibition, which attracted more than 520,000 visitors during its run, showcased works by more than 100 artists, designers and collectives from 30 countries, with 34 newly commissioned works from a mixture of both Australian and international artists.

Publications

The Art Journal of the National Gallery of Victoria, usually referred to as the Art Journal, was first published as The Quarterly Bulletin of the National Gallery of Victoria in 1945 (volume 1, no. 1), changing its name and frequency in 1959 to the Annual Bulletin of the National Gallery of Victoria (edition 1), then to the Art Bulletin of Victoria in 1967–68 (edition 9) (abbreviated to ABV, edition 42). For Edition 50 in 2011, in its 50th year of publication and 150th anniversary of the gallery, the name was changed to its present name.

Directors of the NGV
Directors of the NGV since its inception:
G. F. Folingsby, 1882–1891
Lindsay Bernard Hall, 1892–1935
William Beckwith McInnes, (acting) 1935–1936
P. M. Carew-Smyth, (acting) 1937
J. S. Macdonald, 1936–1941
Sir Ernest Daryl Lindsay, 1942–1955
Eric Westbrook, 1956–1973
Gordon Thomson, 1973–1974
Eric Rowlison, 1975–1980
Patrick McCaughey, 1981–1987
T. L. Rodney Wilson, 1988
James Mollison, AO, 1989–1995
Timothy Potts, 1995–1998
Dr Gerard Vaughan, 1999–2012
Tony Ellwood, 2012–present

See also
 List of national galleries

References

External links

Egyptian objects in the National Gallery of Victoria 
Contact Information for the National Gallery of Victoria
Video: Artscape – The NGV Story (Part 1), (Part 2)
 

Art museums and galleries in Melbourne
Landmarks in Melbourne
Buildings and structures in the City of Melbourne (LGA)
Heritage-listed buildings in Melbourne
Buildings and structures completed in 1968
Modernist architecture in Australia
Brutalist architecture in Australia
Art museums established in 1861
1861 establishments in Australia
National museums of Australia

Southbank, Victoria